The Mannar line is a railway line in Sri Lanka. Branching off the northern line at Medawachchiya Junction, the line heads north-west through North Central and Northern provinces before terminating at the town of Talaimannar. The line opened in 1914.

History

International goal
The Mannar line was built as part of a plan to create a rail link between Sri Lanka and India.  A 22-mile bridge to link the two countries had been proposed as early as 1894, by the Consultant Engineer for railways in Madras (Chennai).  The proposal was given serious consideration and a technical blueprint and cost analysis was conducted.  By 1914, the Mannar line was built to connect Talaimannar on Mannar Island to the Sri Lankan mainland.  On the Indian side, the Indian railway network was extended to Dhanushkodi.  The international bridge to link the two was not built.

Operation
During the Mannar line's operation, trains connected Mannar and Talaimannar with cities along the northern line, such as Anuradhapura and Kurunegala, eventually reaching Colombo.  The Boat Mail was a major service on the line, allowing passengers to board a ferry to Rameshwaram in India.  Passengers could use the Boat Mail service to travel between Colombo and Chennai.

The ferry service to connect the railheads at Talaimannar and Dhanushkodi lasted until the 1960s, when a cyclone destroyed the pier and rail line at Dhanushkodi.  The Mannar line was not affected.  The ferry service resumed with a new Indian terminus at Rameshwaram.

War and revival
All services on the line were stopped in June 1990 due to the civil war. The tracks, stations and other infrastructure on the line were subsequently destroyed during the war.

In the 2000s, the rail bridge to connect the two countries was proposed again, highlighting the benefits of connecting the ports of Colombo and Trincomalee with Chennai.

Following the end of the civil war in May 2009, the government initiated various projects to rebuild the entire line. The contract to reconstruct the  line between Medawachchiya Junction and Madhu was awarded to Ircon International, the Indian state-owned engineering and construction company. The project will cost US$ 81 million and would be financed by a soft loan from the Indian government. Ircon International has also been awarded the contract to reconstruct the  line between Madhu and Talaimannar. The project will cost US$ 150 million and would be financed by a soft loan from the Indian government.

The section of the line between Medawachchiya and Madhu Road reopened on 14 May 2013, following its reconstruction.  The reconstruction of the entire line was completed in 2015.

Completion and reopening
 
The entire line was completed up to Talaimannar on 2015. The Indian Railway Construction Company Limited (IRCON) carried out the construction work of both stages of the project which was financed under a US$425 million credit facility from India. The reconstructed railway line was commissioned by Indian Prime Minister Narendra Modi on March 14, 2015.

Opening was accompanied by Sri Lankan President Maithripala Sirisena and ministers Lakshman Kiriella and Rishard Badurdeen.

Services
Railbus services operate from Medawachchiya Junction to Madhu Road, while daily trains operate between Madhu Road and Colombo Fort.

Four train services are operating between Colombo Fort and the Talaimannr Pier daily.

Infrastructure
The Mannar line is entirely single track, at  broad gauge, both before the war and after reconstruction.  The line was not electrified and the current reconstruction project will not include electrification.

References

1914 establishments in Ceylon
5 ft 6 in gauge railways in Sri Lanka
Railway lines in Sri Lanka
Railway lines opened in 1914
Rail transport in Mannar District
Rail transport in Vavuniya District
Transport in North Central Province, Sri Lanka